Carlos Leonardo Herrera (born 27 March 1983) is an Argentine former professional boxer who competed from 2006 to 2014.

Professional career
On September 15, 2009 Herrera lost by first-round knockout to top welterweight prospect Canelo Álvarez.

Professional boxing record

|- style="margin:0.5em auto; font-size:95%;"
|align="center" colspan=8|24 Wins (10 knockouts), 7 Losses, 0 Draw
|- style="margin:0.5em auto; font-size:95%;"
|align=center style="border-style: none none solid solid; background: #e3e3e3"|Res.
|align=center style="border-style: none none solid solid; background: #e3e3e3"|Record
|align=center style="border-style: none none solid solid; background: #e3e3e3"|Opponent
|align=center style="border-style: none none solid solid; background: #e3e3e3"|Type
|align=center style="border-style: none none solid solid; background: #e3e3e3"|Rd., Time
|align=center style="border-style: none none solid solid; background: #e3e3e3"|Date
|align=center style="border-style: none none solid solid; background: #e3e3e3"|Location
|align=center style="border-style: none none solid solid; background: #e3e3e3"|Notes
|-align=center
|Loss || 24-7 ||align=left| Kevin Bizier
|TKO || 2 (8) || | || align=left|
|align=left|
|-align=center
|Loss || 24-6 ||align=left| David Avanesyan
|KO || 2 (10) || | || align=left|
|align=left|
|-align=center
|Loss || 24-5 ||align=left| Mateo Damian Veron
|TKO || 5 (8) || | || align=left|
|align=left|
|-align=center
|Win || 24-4 ||align=left| Mario Javier Nieva
|UD || 8 (8) || | || align=left|
|align=left|
|-align=center
|Win || 23-4 ||align=left| Francisco Nicolas Benitez
|KO || 3 (6) || | || align=left|
|align=left|
|-align=center
|Loss || 22-4 ||align=left| Moez Fhima
|UD || 12 (12) || | || align=left|
|align=left|
|-align=center
|Win || 22-3 ||align=left| Claudio Roberto Fernandez
|TKO || 3 (6) || | || align=left|
|align=left|
|-align=center
|Loss || 21-3 ||align=left| Jorge Daniel Miranda
|UD || 10 (10) || | || align=left|
|align=left|
|-align=center
|Loss || 21-2 ||align=left| Canelo Álvarez
|TKO || 1 (10) || | || align=left|
|align=left|
|-align=center
|Win || 21-1 ||align=left| Claudio Roberto Fernandez
|KO || 8 (8) || | || align=left|
|align=left|
|-align=center
|Win || 20-1 ||align=left| Daniel Alberto Montenegro
|RTD || 5 (10) || | || align=left|
|align=left|
|-align=center
|Win || 19-1 ||align=left| Jorge Daniel Miranda
|KO || 10 (10) || | || align=left|
|align=left|
|-align=center
|Win || 18-1 ||align=left| Ariel Oscar Pieroni
|UD || 8 (8) || | || align=left|
|align=left|
|-align=center
|Loss || 17-1 ||align=left| Juan Manuel Alaggio
|UD || 6 (6) || | || align=left|
|align=left|
|-align=center
|Win || 17-0 ||align=left| Juan Manuel Alaggio
|UD || 8 (8) || | || align=left|
|align=left|
|-align=center
|Win || 16-0 ||align=left| Cesar Adrian Sastre Silva
|UD || 6 (6) || | || align=left|
|align=left|
|-align=center
|Win || 15-0 ||align=left| Juan Jose Dias
|UD || 6 (6) || | || align=left|
|align=left|
|-align=center
|Win || 14-0 ||align=left| Juan Jose Dias
|UD || 6 (6) || | || align=left|
|align=left|
|-align=center
|Win || 13-0 ||align=left| Cristian Gustavo Sosa
|KO || 2 (4) || | || align=left|
|align=left|
|-align=center
|Win || 12-0 ||align=left| Jorge Antonio Asaad
|KO || 4 (6) || | || align=left|
|align=left|
|-align=center

References

External links

Argentine male boxers
Sportspeople from Santa Fe, Argentina
Middleweight boxers
1983 births
Living people